Catherine Jean "Cathy" Barton Para was an American folk musician from Boonville, Missouri known for her performances of traditional Ozark music and her proficiency on the banjo and hammered dulcimer. For more than four decades she performed with her husband Dave Para. She performed at the Grand Ole Opry in Nashville, on the television show Hee Haw, and regularly at Boonville's Big Muddy Folk Festival, which she helped found.

Early life and education
Barton was born the child of military parents in Fort Benning, Georgia.  After living in Pennsylvania, Virginia, Hawaii, and Kentucky, her family settled in Columbia, Missouri where she graduated from Hickman High School.  She received  a Bachelor's degree from Stephens College in Columbia and a Master's degree in 1979 in folklore from Western Kentucky University.

Discography
 Ballad of the Boonslick, with Dave Para (1982)
 On a Day Like Today, with Dave Para (1986)
 Twas On a Night Like This, A Christmas Legacy With the Paton Family, Dave Para, Ed Trickett, Skip Gorman and Gordon Bok (1992)
 For All the Good People, A Golden Ring Reunion with the Patons, Dave Para, Ed Trickett, and Harry Tuft  (1991)
 Johnny Whistletrigger, Civil War Songs from the Western Border with Dave Para and Bob Dyer (1995)
 Rebel in the Woods, Civil War Songs from the Western Border Vol. II with Dave Para and Bob Dyer (1995)
 Crazy Quilt with Dave Para (1998)
 Living on the River with Dave Para (2000)
 Most Perfect Harmony, Lewis and Clark: A Musical Journey with the Discovery String Band (2003)
 Sabbath Home, with Dave Para (2006)
 The Wandering Fool, The Songs of Bob Dyer Sung in Tribute by His Friends (2008)
 Sweet Journeys, with Dave Para (2010)
 Gumbo Bottoms, a Big Muddy Musical (2014)
 Carp Fishing in America, with Dave Para (2017)

References

External links

People from Boonville, Missouri
Folk musicians from Missouri
American banjoists
Women banjoists
Appalachian dulcimer players
People from Columbus, Georgia
21st-century American women guitarists
Guitarists from Columbia, Missouri
Stephens College alumni
Western Kentucky University alumni
American folk singers
20th-century American women singers
20th-century American singers
21st-century American women singers
1955 births
2019 deaths